The Journal of Materials Science is a weekly peer-reviewed scientific journal covering all aspects of materials science. It was established in 1966 by Robert W. Cahn and is published by Springer Science+Business Media. The journal incorporated Journal of Materials Science Letters in 2003 and Interface Science in 2004. The Editor-in-Chief is C. Barry Carter (University of Connecticut).

In 2012, the journal announced an annual "Cahn Prize" for best paper published in the journal, in honor of its founding editor.
In 2021, the journal announced a similar annual "Bonfield Prize" for best review paper published in the journal, in honor of a former Editor-in-Chief, William Bonfield. There are two more specialized sister journals, Journal of Materials Science: Materials in Medicine and Journal of Materials Science: Materials in Electronics.

Abstracting and indexing
The journal is abstracted and indexed in:

According to the Journal Citation Reports, the journal has a 2020 impact factor of 4.220, ranking it 82nd out of 293 journals in the category "Materials Science, Multidisciplinary".

See also
Journal of Materials Science Letters

References

External links

English-language journals
Publications established in 1966
Springer Science+Business Media academic journals
Materials science journals
Biweekly journals